A double album (or double record) is an audio album that spans two units of the primary medium in which it is sold, typically either records or compact disc. A double album is usually, though not always, released as such because the recording is longer than the capacity of the medium. Recording artists often think of double albums as being a single piece artistically; however, there are exceptions such as John Lennon's Some Time in New York City (which consisted of one studio record and one live album packaged together) and OutKast's Speakerboxxx/The Love Below (effectively two solo albums, one by each member of the duo).
Since the advent of the compact disc, albums are sometimes released with a bonus disc featuring additional material as a supplement to the main album, with live tracks, studio out-takes, cut songs, or older unreleased material. One innovation was the inclusion of a DVD of related material with a compact disc, such as video related to the album or DVD-Audio versions of the same recordings. Some such discs were also released on a two-sided format called DualDisc.

Depending on the media used, some releases were double albums in one format and single albums in another. For example, a gramophone record (vinyl LP) consisting of two discs of less than 80 minutes in total could be fit onto a single standard-length compact disc (CD). Other times, track order could vary between two different media by rearranging the tracks in one medium, or a more efficient use of space could be made; for example, reducing a double album in LP format to a single cassette tape.

The same principles apply to the triple album, which comprises three units. Packages with more units than three are often referred to as a box set.

History

1948 to the early 1970s: long-play records 
The introduction of the long-play or LP record in 1948 allowed longer tracks or a greater number of tracks per record, with approximately 22 minutes of music per side, for a total of 44 minutes. Despite this, recordings of entire classical or operatic pieces were often too long for one LP disc, thus albums of two or more discs were made. As they were costly to make and sell, double albums and multi-record releases were largely limited to long works such as classical music and, later, to live recordings and compilations. One of the first live double albums, and one of the earliest double albums featuring non-classical music, was The Famous 1938 Carnegie Hall Jazz Concert by Benny Goodman, a concert recording released in 1950 on Columbia Records. Studio recordings of operas have been released as double, triple, quadruple and quintuple albums since the 1950s.

As record costs reduced over time and greater thought was given to the album as an artistic piece, double albums became more common. One of the first examples consisting of new studio recordings is 1956's Ella Fitzgerald Sings the Cole Porter Song Book. Bob Dylan's Blonde on Blonde, released on June 20, 1966, is widely considered to be one of the first double albums in popular music with complete original recordings by the artist. It was followed just a week later by the Mothers of Invention's debut album Freak Out!, which was released on June 27, 1966.

In the years following, original double albums from pop and rock artists became more common, and were often released at the height of the artists' careers. Notable examples include The Beatles' eponymous 1968 album, Elton John’s Goodbye Yellow Brick Road from 1973, and Led Zeppelin's Physical Graffiti from 1975. Additionally, the rise of progressive rock at the time, which often involves complex and long tracks akin to classical music, and concept albums often made a second disc necessary. The best-selling double album of all time is Pink Floyd's The Wall, from 1979 with over 30 million copies (60 million units) sold worldwide.

Late 1970s–1990s: compact cassette tapes and CDs 
In the latter half of the 1970s, as technology advanced, the Philips corporation's compact cassette tape began to supersede LPs as the dominant pre-recorded music format. The tapes allowed for a much longer 30 to 45 minutes per side, for a total of 60 to 90 minutes total, doubling the length available for music storage. In 1982, Philips introduced the compact disc, with a continuous length of 74 minutes (later developed to have 80 minutes). Artists could put far more on one unit, rarely exceeding the runtime available on a cassette tape or CD, and double albums became uncommon. The extra space also allowed many earlier double albums to be reissued on a single disc: Blonde on Blonde, for instance, was reissued on a single cassette and a single CD.

Despite the greater length, there were some issues with the length and track order of albums, both reissues and new releases. The Beatles, originally released as a double LP, remained split across two units for both its cassette and CD reissues, with the tracks in a different order on the pair of cassettes to ensure equal tape length. Meanwhile, 1988's He's the DJ, I'm the Rapper by DJ Jazzy Jeff & The Fresh Prince was released on both vinyl and cassette. At 85 minutes, the vinyl record was released as a double album, making it the first double vinyl LP release by hip hop artists, while its single CD release was truncated by 13 minutes. Other albums originally issued as double LPs, such as Mike Oldfield's Incantations (1978), Chick Corea's My Spanish Heart (1976), Fleetwood Mac's Tusk (1979), and The Minutemen’s Double Nickels on the Dime (1984) were likewise shortened for their 74-minute CD release, though both were later reissued in their entirety when 80-minute CDs were available.

While not as common since the advent of these formats, particularly for studio albums, double albums continued to be released, particularly for live recordings, classical music, soundtracks, compilations, reissues of double-LP albums that still exceeded the 80-minute CD limit, and a number of popular studio albums were released as double albums on these formats at this time, such as the Smashing Pumpkins' Mellon Collie and the Infinite Sadness (1995) and Michael Jackson's HIStory: Past, Present and Future, Book I (1995) which sold over 20 million copies (40 million units) worldwide. The following year, Tupac Shakur became the first rapper to sell a double album globally with All Eyez on Me, becoming his best selling album by the time he died in 1996.

Sequencing

With regard to records, most double album sets are organized by manual sequencing, where the order of sides played are laid much as they are on a single LP; Side one and two are organized back-to-back on the first disc, as are three and four on the second disc and so on. However, some releases up to the 1970s are optimized for automatic sequencing. On a double album, this would have had sides one and four on one disc and sides two and three on the other. This sequencing, used previously in multi-disc albums in the 78rpm era, let the listener play through the entire double album and only need to flip over the records once, compared to manual sequencing where the listener would have to change the side or record three times. The use of automatic sequencing gradually declined during the 1970s as automatic record changers fell out of favor. High quality manual turntables became more affordable and are often preferred because they cause less record wear.

After a company decided on manual or automatic sequence, production of that title generally stayed in the same configuration indefinitely. Notable examples of albums using automatic sequence include the 1968 Reprise Records release, Electric Ladyland, by The Jimi Hendrix Experience which was still sold in automatic sequence well into the late 1980s. Other common examples include Frampton Comes Alive! by Peter Frampton, Songs in the Key of Life by Stevie Wonder,  Tommy and Quadrophenia by The Who, and Bad Girls by Donna Summer.

Sesquialbum
There are only a few examples of a sesquialbum (i.e. one and a half records).

Johnny Winter released what would be the first three-sided rock album, Second Winter, on two 12-inch discs, with the flip side of the second disc being blank. A 1976 live concert recording by Keith Jarrett and his quartet, released as Eyes of the Heart by ECM Records in 1979, Joe Jackson's 1986 release Big World, and Pavement's Wowee Zowee are other examples of this.

In 1975, jazz artist Rahsaan Roland Kirk released The Case of the 3 Sided Dream in Audio Color which apparently had only three sides, but on closer inspection, there were a small number of grooves pressed on side four with a few short "hidden" conversation snippets; the CD reissue includes all of them.

In 1982, Todd Rundgren and his band released the self-titled album Utopia featuring one full LP of 10 songs, and a second 12-inch disc with five bonus tracks, the same lineup on each side.

The Monty Python album Matching Tie and Handkerchief was originally issued with two concentric grooves with different programs on the second side, but this was done for comedic rather than practical reasons. The 2019 vinyl issue of Monty Python Sings (again) comprises two discs, with the flip side of the second disc featuring exclusive Monty Python 50th Anniversary artwork.

The Stranglers, Elvis Costello and The Clash (amongst other 1970s/80s acts) would sometimes release early pressings of their albums with extra material on a 45 RPM single. The Sunlandic Twins by Of Montreal features a third side officially called a "bonus EP", essentially offering an alternate definition of an EP, a single  RPM side instead of a two-sided 45 RPM record.

The 1992 Julian Cope album Jehovahkill contained three sides, or "phases", with a laser-etched fourth side which was unplayable, which also occurred with Norwegian band Motorpsycho's vinyl releases of Motorpsycho presents The International Tussler Society and Heavy Metal Fruit, and Excepter's 2014 album Familiar (the third side, with only one track, being shorter).

Seattle band Alice in Chains released their first two EPs, Jar of Flies, and Sap on two vinyl discs in 1994, with three sides on vinyl, while the fourth side contained a laser etching of the Alice in Chains logo. The vinyl pressing of the My Chemical Romance album The Black Parade also has three sides worth of content, with side four being a laser etching of a portion of the limited edition album art.

Genesis' Three Sides Live, Kiss' Alive II, Donna Summer's Live and More, and the Moody Blues' Caught Live Plus 5 are examples of double albums with three sides of live recordings (i.e. one and a half albums) and one side of studio recordings.

The vinyl reissues of two albums by The Tragically Hip, Trouble at the Henhouse and Music @ Work, are on two discs, but the fourth side is blank. In the 2010s and 2020s, as more digital era albums from the 1990s and 2000s were issued on vinyl, often for the first time, blank sides became more common and often included etchings into the fourth side, such as the reissues of EART HL I NG by David Bowie (previously released on 1LP in 1997), Alice by Tom Waits and soundtrack albums such as The Crow and School of Rock.

Triple album
Among the first successful triple albums (or triple records) were Woodstock: Music from the Original Soundtrack and More, released August 15, 1970, and George Harrison's All Things Must Pass, released November 27, 1970. A triple album may be live, such as The Band's The Last Waltz (1978) and Led Zeppelin's How the West Was Won (2003); or a compilation of an artist's work, such as Stevie Wonder's retrospective anthology Looking Back. Yes's live album Yessongs was made a triple album owing to its inclusion of many of the band's longer compositions. With the longer time available on compact disc, many albums that spanned three vinyl discs are able to fit on two compact discs (an example being Nine Inch Nails' The Fragile).

Triple albums are released across genres, including punk with The Clash's Sandinista!; alternative rock with Pearl Jam's 11/6/00 – Seattle, Washington; and mainstream pop with Prince's Emancipation.

Frank Sinatra's Trilogy: Past Present Future was originally released as a three LP set in 1980. Compact disc pressings of the album combine the triple vinyl set onto two CDs, with "Past" and "Present" taking up the first disc.

The first triple hip-hop album was American Hunger by New York City rap artist MF Grimm which was released in 2006. It contains 20 songs on each disc.

American hip hop artist Lupe Fiasco's canceled third studio album release LupEND would have been a triple album, composed of discs titled "Everywhere", "Nowhere", and "Down Here". Joanna Newsom's 2010 album Have One on Me is a triple album; due to the unusual length of the songs, there are only six tracks on each disc.

Escalator over the Hill, Carla Bley's jazz opera (lyrics by Paul Haines), was originally released in 1971 as a triple album in a box which also contained a booklet with lyrics, photos and profiles of the musicians.

The Great Concert of Charles Mingus by Charles Mingus was recorded in 1964 and released in 1971.

The Weeknd's compilation album Trilogy was released as a triple album in 2012, comprising his critically acclaimed 2011 mixtapes House of Balloons, Echoes of Silence and Thursday.

The Knife's 2013 album Shaking the Habitual is spread across three LPs and two CDs, being an hour and forty minutes in length. (Although a single-disc edit exists omitting the 19 minute track, "Old Dreams Waiting To Be Realized").

Swallow the Sun's 2015 album Songs from the North I, II & III is divided into Gloom, Beauty and Despair. In total, each disc contains no more than 8 tracks and no less than 40 minutes.

In April 2021, Eric Church released a triple album set, Heart & Soul. Each album Heart, &, and Soul, was released separately, with & being a vinyl-exclusive release.

Christina Aguilera's Spanish-language ninth studio album, Aguilera (2022), was separated into three parts: La Fuerza, La Tormenta, and La Luz. Each part receive its own independent release as a separate project, before being included as separate discs in the album's digital version. Physical versions of the album include all the parts in one disc.

Box set

When albums exceed the triple album format they are generally referred to as box sets. Normally, albums consisting of four or more discs are compilations or live recordings, such as In a Word: Yes (1969–) and Chicago at Carnegie Hall, respectively.

Studio albums with more than three discs are very rare. Notable examples include:
 French singer Léo Ferré's four-disc studio concept album named L'Opéra du pauvre (1983)
 Composer and guitarist Frank Zappa proposed Läther as a four-disc studio/live album in 1977. The project got as far as test pressings at the time, and would only be released posthumously as a triple-CD (and vinyl box set for Japan only) in 1996.
 Pan Sonic with a four-disc studio album named Kesto (234.48:4) (2004)
 Esham released a four-disc box set in 2006, which was a re-release of his 1992 album Judgement Day.
 British singer-songwriter Chris Rea with his 11-disc set Blue Guitars (2006)
 Avant-garde guitarist Buckethead with his 13-disc set In Search of The (2007)
 Canadian country artist Brett Kissel will release the 4-album set The Compass Project (2023)

Simultaneous releases

Some performers have released two or more distinct but related albums simultaneously (or near-simultaneously) which could be seen together as a double album. Moby Grape's Wow/Grape Jam (released in 1968) is an early example. Others include:

 Guns N' Roses' Use Your Illusion I and II (1991) (In fact both of these were double albums in and of themselves)
 Donovan's A Gift from a Flower to a Garden (1967), one of rock's earliest box set releases, comprising two albums, Wear Your Love Like Heaven and For Little Ones.
 Frank Zappa's Joe's Garage, Acts I, II & III (1979) (Act I was released in September 1979, Act II & Act III were released as one double album in November of the same year, all three acts were later reissued as a triple album in 1987) 
 Basement Jaxx's Planet 1, Planet 2 (2008) and Planet 3 (2009) (Recorded in same sessions but released months apart)
 Basement Jaxx's Scars and Zephyr (2009) (Recorded in same sessions but released months apart)
 Genesis' The Way We Walk, Volume One: The Shorts (1992) and The Way We Walk, Volume Two: The Longs (1993) (Recorded on their 1992 We Can't Dance Tour. Disc one features live versions of their hit singles; Disc two features live versions of their longer album pieces)
 Green Day's ¡Uno!, ¡Dos!, ¡Tré! trilogy (2012) (Recorded in same sessions but released months apart)
 Stone Sour's House of Gold & Bones – Part 1 (2012) and House of Gold & Bones – Part 2 (2013) (Recorded in same sessions but released months apart)
 Bruce Springsteen's Human Touch and Lucky Town (1992)
 System of a Down's Mezmerize and Hypnotize (2005) (Recorded in same sessions but released months apart)
 Justin Timberlake's The 20/20 Experience and The 20/20 Experience – 2 of 2 (2013) (Recorded in same sessions but released months apart)
 Tom Waits' Blood Money and Alice (2002)
 Bright Eyes' I'm Wide Awake, It's Morning and Digital Ash in a Digital Urn (2005)
 Metallica's Load and ReLoad (1996/1997) (Originally conceived as a double album, before being released separately)
 Mudvayne's The New Game (2008) and self-titled album (2009) (Originally conceived as a double album at one point prior to being released as separate albums years apart, though they were recorded at the same time)
 Nelly's Sweat and Suit (2004)
 Radiohead's Kid A and Amnesiac (2000/2001) (Recorded in same sessions and considered for release as a double album at one point)
Sabrina Carpenter's Singular: Act I and Singular: Act II (2018/2019) (Recorded in same sessions but released months apart)
 Archive's Controlling Crowds and Controlling Crowds Part IV were both released in 2009. The latter album serves as an expansion to the parts I–III, which the former album's tracks are divided into. A bundle containing both albums has also been sold.
 Coheed and Cambria's The Afterman: Ascension and The Afterman: Descension (2012/2013) (Recorded in same sessions but released months apart)
 Deerhunter's Microcastle and Weird Era Cont. (2008) (Weird Era Cont. was recorded in response to Microcastle being leaked online months in advance; the two albums were released as a double CD; Microcastle was also a separate releases)
 Death Grips' Niggas on the Moon (2014) and Jenny Death (2015) (Both were recorded in the same year but released simultaneously nine months after the release of Niggas on the Moon on their double album, The Powers That B)
 Future's Future and Hndrxx (2017) (Released one week apart)
 Hurd's The Best Collection I and II (1997) (Recorded in same sessions)
 Insane Clown Posse's Bizaar and Bizzar (2000)
 DJ Magic Mike's This Is How It Should Be Done and Bass: The Final Frontier (1993)
 maudlin of the Well's Bath and Leaving Your Body Map (2001) (Both albums were reissued together in a vinyl box set on Blood Music in 2012.)
 Opeth's Deliverance and Damnation (2002/2003) (Recorded in same sessions but released months apart)
 Periphery's Juggernaut: Alpha and Juggernaut: Omega (2015)
 Simple Minds' Sons and Fascination/Sister Feelings Call (1981) (Originally conceived two separate albums, before released as one)
 Both eponymous Red House Painters albums from 1993 (often named Rollercoaster and Bridge respectively) were initially created with the intent of releasing a double album, but were released separately about five months apart.
 Sixx:A.M.'s Prayers For The Damned, Vol. 1 and Prayers For The Blessed, Vol. 2 (Recorded in the same sessions but released months apart)
 Taylor Swift's folklore and evermore (Both written and recorded during the 2020 COVID-19 lockdown and released months apart)
King Gizzard and the Lizard Wizard's K.G. and L.W. (2020/2021)
Nine Inch Nails' Ghosts V: Together and Ghosts VI: Locusts (released on the same day: March 26, 2020)

See also
 Double EP
 List of double albums
 List of triple albums

References

Album types
Audio storage